Benton is a city in Scott County, Missouri, United States. The population was 863 at the 2010 census. It is the county seat of Scott County.

History
Benton was settled as early as 1796.  The town site was platted in 1822. The community was named for Thomas Hart Benton. A post office has been in operation at Benton since 1823.

Geography
Benton is located at  (37.097073, -89.562341).

Demographics

2010 census
As of the census of 2010, there were 863 people, 311 households, and 214 families living in the city. The racial makeup of the city was 94.21% White, 4.87% Black or African American, 0.23% from other races, and 0.70% from two or more races. Hispanic or Latino of any race were 1.51% of the population.

There were 311 households, of which 35.0% had children under the age of 18 living with them, 54.0% were married couples living together, 10.9% had a female householder with no husband present, 3.9% had a male householder with no wife present, and 31.2% were non-families. 27.0% of all households were made up of individuals, and 10.9% had someone living alone who was 65 years of age or older. The average household size was 2.45 and the average family size was 2.97.

The median age in the city was 35.5 years. 24.2% of residents were under the age of 18; 9.5% were between the ages of 18 and 24; 30.5% were from 25 to 44; 24.7% were from 45 to 64; and 11.1% were 65 years of age or older. The gender makeup of the city was 52.8% male and 47.2% female.

2000 census
As of the census of 2000, there were 732 people, 287 households, and 191 families living in the city. The population density was 1,770.0 people per square mile (689.3/km2). There were 301 housing units at an average density of 727.8 per square mile (283.5/km2). The racial makeup of the city was 97.54% White, 2.05% African American and 0.41% Native American. Hispanic or Latino of any race were 1.23% of the population.

There were 287 households, out of which 32.8% had children under the age of 18 living with them, 53.3% were married couples living together, 9.1% had a female householder with no husband present, and 33.4% were non-families. 30.0% of all households were made up of individuals, and 16.7% had someone living alone who was 65 years of age or older. The average household size was 2.40 and the average family size was 3.02.

In the city, the population was spread out, with 23.2% under the age of 18, 10.5% from 18 to 24, 29.8% from 25 to 44, 21.0% from 45 to 64, and 15.4% who were 65 years of age or older. The median age was 36 years. For every 100 females there were 92.6 males. For every 100 females age 18 and over, there were 95.1 males.

The median income for a household in the city was $33,365, and the median income for a family was $45,179. Males had a median income of $27,014 versus $20,662 for females. The per capita income for the city was $16,161. About 4.2% of families and 7.5% of the population were below the poverty line, including 8.9% of those under age 18 and 7.2% of those age 65 or over.

Education
Benton is served by the Scott County R-IV School District, which operates one elementary school, one middle school, and Thomas W. Kelly High School.

Benton has a public library, a branch of the Riverside Regional Library.

References

Cities in Scott County, Missouri
County seats in Missouri
Populated places established in 1860
Cities in Missouri